Meteterakis is a genus of nematodes belonging to the family Heterakidae.

The species of this genus are found in Malesia and Japan.

Species:

Meteterakis amamiensis
Meteterakis formosensis 
Meteterakis formosensis 
Meteterakis ishikawanae 
Meteterakis japonica 
Meteterakis occidentalis 
Meteterakis occidentalis 
Meteterakis singaporensis
Meteterakis wangi
Meteterakis wonosoboensis

References

Nematodes